Kailas Nath Wanchoo (25 February 1903 – 1988) was the tenth Chief Justice of India.

He was born in Allahabad into a Kashmiri Pandit family and was educated  on primary at Nowgong, Madhya Pradesh and middle at Pandit Pirthi Nath High School, Kanpur, Muir Central College, Allahabad and Wadham College, Oxford. He joined the Indian Civil Service as Joint Magistrate on 1 December 1926 in Uttar Pradesh.

Official positions 

Allahabad High Court Judge, Feb. 1947-Jan. 1951
Rajasthan High Court Chief Justice 1951-58
Uttar Pradesh Judicial Reforms Committee Chairman, 1950–51
Indore Firing Inquiry Commission Sole Member, 1954
Dholpur Succession Case Commission Chairman, 1955
Law Commission Member, 1955.
Chief Justice of India on 12 April 1967. Retired on 24 February 1968.

References 
Supreme Court of India profile

University of Allahabad alumni
Alumni of Wadham College, Oxford
Chief justices of India
Indian civil servants
Indian Civil Service (British India) officers
Scholars from Allahabad
Indian people of Kashmiri descent
Kashmiri people
Kashmiri Pandits
Judges of the Allahabad High Court
Year of death missing
Chief Justices of the Rajasthan High Court
20th-century Indian judges
1903 births
20th-century Indian lawyers